Twelve Stops and Home is the debut studio album by the Feeling, released on 5 June 2006. The album's title refers to the twelve stops on the Piccadilly line of the London Underground from Leicester Square to Bounds Green. Lead singer Dan Gillespie Sells grew up in Bounds Green and lived a short walk from the tube station.

Reception

The album was divisive among music critics. It gained a five-star review from The Observer, but garnered a scathing 1/10 from both Drowned in Sound and Yahoo! Music. On Metacritic, the album has a weighted average score of 58 out of 100 based on 7 reviews, indicating "mixed or average reviews".

Five singles were released from the album, including the top 10 hits, "Sewn", "Fill My Little World" and "Never Be Lonely". "Sewn" was also featured on the FIFA 07 soundtrack.

Chart performance
Twelve Stops and Home placed at number one on the UK Amazon and iTunes charts. It charted in the UK Albums Chart on 11 June 2006 at number 2, below Smile... It Confuses People by Sandi Thom. In its second week, it descended to number 3 following Smile... It Confuses People at number 2, and the second Keane album, Under the Iron Sea.

In its first week on sale in the UK it sold 43,304 copies and in its second week it sold 39,000 copies. The album has been certified 3× Platinum in the UK, selling almost 900,000 copies and has sold around 1.5 million copies worldwide.

It charted at number 20 on the Top Heatseekers in the United States.

Track listing
All songs were written and produced by the Feeling except where noted.

Personnel 
Source:

Musicians
 Lead vocals, guitar – Dan Gillespie Sells
 Guitar, vocals – Kevin Jeremiah
 Keyboards, vocals – Ciaran Jeremiah
 Bass guitar, vocals – Richard Jones (5)
 Drums – Paul Stewart (4)
 Backing vocals – Sonny Jones (7)

Technical
 Producers – The Feeling
 Co-producer – Andy Green (2, 5, 7)
 Engineers – Andy Green (2, 5, 7, 8), Cenzo Townshend (tracks: 1, 3, 4, 6, 9 to 12)
 Mixers – Chris Potter (1, 3, 4, 6, 9 to 12), Mark "Spike" Stent (2, 5, 7, 8)
 Cover photography – Sølve Sundsbø
 Cover (post production) – Digital Light
 Designer, art director – Tappin Gofton

Charts

Weekly charts

Year-end charts

Certifications

References

2006 debut albums
The Feeling albums
Island Records albums